The Order of Civil Merit is an award for service to Spain.

Order of Civil Merit may also refer to:

 Order of Civil Merit (Bulgaria)
 Order of Civil Merit (France)
 Order of Civil Merit (South Korea)
 Order of Civil Merit of the Syrian Arab Republic

See also
 Order of merit (disambiguation)
 Order of Civic Merit of Laos